Florida is a neighborhood in Vicente López Partido, Buenos Aires Province, Argentina. The community is a suburb in the Buenos Aires metropolitan area. In 2020 the population was estimated at 48,158, making it the second most populated neighborhood in Vicente López Partido. It is 15 kilometers north of downtown Buenos Aires.

Florida grew and prospered in the late 1800s when it became a railway stop; the community became progressively more urban and started to receive Italian and English immigrants who set small farms that provided vegetables and fruits to nearby Buenos Aires. Nowadays it is an upper middle class residential area serving as a bedroom community. 

It is bordered to the east by Vicente López neighborhood, to the north by Olivos, to the south by the city of Buenos Aires, and to the west by Villa Martelli.

Location 

Florida is served by the Mitre and Belgrano Norte railway lines, both providing fast access to the city of Buenos Aires. Its main commercial areas are Maipú Avenue and San Martín Avenue.

Transport 

Florida is well-connected to the other northern suburbs of the Buenos Aires metropolitan area, and to downtown Buenos Aires, and especially to Jorge Newbery airport.

The neighborhood is connected to the rest of the city by two highways, one Metrobus line, 21 bus lines and four train stations (Aristóbulo del Valle, Florida, Juan B. Justo and Cetrángolo).

History 
Florida Este was founded in 1891 when the Buenos Aires and Rosario Railway opened a station in the section from Belgrano that then reached Bartolomé Mitre, Borges and San Isidro. Some versions state that the station (and subsequently the village) was named "Florida" to commemorate a victory over a Spanish army in the Paraje La Florida of Alto Perú on May 25, 1814, during the War of Independence.

The official date of establishment was set by a decree that gave approval to the builder of the railway line to divide the lands into lots for future sale. The date was set on May 7, 1891. Between 1895 and 1915 the "Compañía de los Ferrocarriles Pobladores" and the French Bank,  owner of lands in the zone, sold them to families that soon arrived.

The Florida Este station was a meeting-place for the inhabitants of the districts, with Luis Poggi's general store (located on the corner of San Martín and Fray Justo Sarmiento) as one of the pioneers in the zone. Most of the residential houses were grouped near the station, while the country hoses were in what is now Melo street. Small vegetable farms were established near Mitre Avenue.

By Municipal Ordinance, Florida was declared a "village", in 1907. Six years later the bishop of La Plata, Juan Terrero, blessed a precarious chapel built on lands donated by José Antonio Trabucco. The Rossi family donated an image of the Virgin Mary sculpted in Carrara marble in Italy. The first priest of the region was Father José A. Coffa, who was succeeded by Father Vanini, who started works for a construction of the church. The church, finished in 1931, was named "Nuestra Señora de la Guardia", and was the first church in Florida.

Education

In the area there are several educational institutions. According to Vicente Lopez Municipality information in 2017 there were:
Kindergartens
Kindergarten No. 3: Franklin 1785, West Florida.
Kindergarten  No. 5: Tuyutí 1119, West Florida.3
Kindergarten  N ° 8: Santa Rosa 4148, Florida West.
Kindergarten  No. 10: Aristóbulo del Valle 2375, Florida.
Kindergarten  No. 13: Melo 1861, Florida.

Primary Education
Manuel Dorrego School, Posadas 1115 - Florida Oeste - Vicente López

Municipal Training Centers
"JORGE LLOBET",  Santa Rosa 4146, Florida West
Vicente López Community College (CUV)

Private Schools
The area had a German school, Rudolf-Steiner-Schule.

Sports 
Florida Este is home to the Club Atlético Platense, established in 1905, which hosts a wide range of sports. Their football team plays in the AFA. Platense's home ground is Estadio Ciudad de Vicente López. 

Another club in the neighborhood is Sportivo Balcarce, which played in Primera División in the 1920s.

Gallery

References

External links

 La Página de Florida

Vicente López Partido
Populated places in Buenos Aires Province
Populated places established in 1856
Cities in Argentina
Argentina